"Miles to Go (Before I Sleep)" is a promotional single from Celine Dion's album, Let's Talk About Love (1997). It was released on 28 September 1998 in Canada only. The song was written and produced by Corey Hart, who also wrote for Dion "Where Is the Love" on Let's Talk About Love and "Prayer" on A New Day Has Come.

Background and release
The song is based on the 1923 poem "Stopping by Woods on a Snowy Evening" by Robert Frost; the full title is the poem's closing phrase.

The recording of "Miles to Go (Before I Sleep)" was included as a bonus on the Au cœur du stade DVD.

There was no music video made.

The single peaked at number 17 on the Canadian Adult Contemporary Chart.

Charts

Weekly charts

Year-end charts

References

External links

1997 songs
1998 singles
1990s ballads
Celine Dion songs
Columbia Records singles
Epic Records singles
Pop ballads
Songs based on poems